"Jamaica Say You Will" (alternately "Jamaica, Say You Will") is a song written and performed by American singer-songwriter Jackson Browne. It is the first song on his 1972 self-titled debut album.

History 
The song was released by The Byrds on their Byrdmaniax album the year before Browne's version came out, so many people were familiar with it before ever hearing Browne's recording.

Browne has referred to the song as a "fable," but one based in real experience. "I thought I was kind of writing it for this girl I knew that worked in a garden in Zuma Beach, across the street from the Pacific Ocean, and she worked in this organic food orchard," Browne said in an interview, "like the Garden of Eden, and she was the kind of Eden-like girl, too." He continues: "When I created the fable of this girl who lived by the sea and whose father is a captain, and eventually she would be taken away and go sailing off, I wanted to hide in the relationship. I wanted to sort of have the cocoon of this relationship to just stay sort of insulated from the world. And she was ready to move out into the world and was... you know, the relationship had broken up. That's the ... reality that was going on in my life. I just think it's odd that that's exactly how songs come into being, but if you feel it, it's about something."

Fitting into Browne's concern with water-based lyric themes, the song seemingly is a more straightforwardly traditional and conventional narrative than much of Browne's other early works, but the lyrics about a lost love can be read dually as a period piece - with its references to Jamaica as "daughter of a captain on the rolling seas" and to her sister ringing the "evening bell" - and, as Browne seems to confirm, as a memory of a lost young love from Browne's past near the California coast.

She would stare across the water from the trees
Last time he was home he held her on his knees
And said the next time they would sail away just where they pleased.

The narrator wants her to stay to "help me find a way to fill these empty hours; say you will come again tomorrow," but "next thing I knew, we had brought her things down to the bay -- what could I do."

Browne performed the song on The Old Grey Whistle Test in 1972.

Reception
Calling it an "exquisite love song," in 1972, Bud Scoppa in Rolling Stone spent a large part of his review discussing and gushing about "Jamaica Say You Will," explaining how he felt the song "perfectly embodies Browne's writing and performing approach:"

"A full-chorded grand piano gives the song a rolling, even motion and a certain austerity of mood. Browne plays his voice off the piano's restrained tone, soaring up from his own basically understated vocal in mid-verse and chorus. This underplaying of mood lights Jackson's simple but evocative images with a muted radiance that aurally captures the look of McCabe and Mrs. Miller. While the music sets the tone, Browne deftly tells the tale, his imagery charged with vivid suggestion. ... Much of the dramatic force of "Jamaica" derives from its gorgeous choruses. Each chorus builds tension by offsetting its lyrical meter from the movement of the music, so that the first part of each line is packed tightly and the second part is stretched out, as here, in the second chorus:

Jamaica Sayyy yoou wi-lll
Help-me-find-a Wayyy tooo fi-lll
These-lifeless-sails-and Stayyy uhhhntil
My ships can find the sea.

Harmonies enter at the "Sayyy" section of each of the first three lines, accenting the rush of words that precedes them. All the tension built up by the struggle for balance between the lyrical and musical structures resolves itself gracefully in the even last line. Naturally, Browne's single-minded delivery drives the tension to even greater heights, and the song soars. It's as moving a love song as I've ever heard."

Clarence White played lead acoustic guitar on the song.

Cover versions

 The Byrds - Byrdmaniax, 1971.
 Nitty Gritty Dirt Band - All the Good Times, 1972.
 Tom Rush - Merrimack County, 1972.
 Joe Cocker - Jamaica Say You Will, 1975.
 The Seldom Scene - At the Scene, 1983.
 The Byrds - Live at Royal Albert Hall 1971, 2008.
 Ben Harper - Looking Into You: A Tribute to Jackson Browne, 2014.
 Los Lobos - Native Sons (2021)

Use in other media
The song is heard playing on the radio at the end of The Wonder Years episode "The Lake" from Season 5. However, the episode is set in August 1971, several months before the album was released.

References

1972 songs
Songs written by Jackson Browne
Jackson Browne songs
Songs about Jamaica